This is a list of records held by wrestlers of professional sumo. Only performances in official tournaments or honbasho are included here. Since 1958 six honbasho have been held every year, giving wrestlers from the modern era more opportunities to accumulate championships and wins. Before this, tournaments were held less frequently; sometimes only once or twice per year.

Names in bold indicate a still active wrestler. The tables are up to date as of the end of the November 2022 tournament.

Most top division championships

Most career championships

+ Raiden is said to have had the best record in 28 tournaments between 1790 and 1810, Tanikaze 21 between 1772 and 1793, and Kashiwado 16 between 1812 and 1822. Tachiyama won two unofficial championships and nine official, giving him a total of 11.

Most undefeated championships

+ Tournaments have been consistently fifteen days long since May 1949. Before that date there were a number of different lengths, including ten, eleven, twelve, and thirteen days. The records of Tachiyama, Tochigiyama and Tsunenohana also include some draws, holds and rest days.

Most consecutive championships

+ Four of these titles were zenshō-yūshō (undefeated championships) and were part of Hakuhō's second-place streak of 63 consecutive wins.
† Includes a sweep of all six tournaments in 2005. Asashōryū remains the only wrestler to have won all tournaments in a six-tournament calendar year (post-1949).
‡ All of Futabayama's victories in this streak were zenshō-yūshō (undefeated championships) and were part of Futabayama's record setting 69 consecutive wins.
÷ Raiden is said to have had the best record in nine consecutive tournaments between 1806 and 1810

Most championship playoffs

Most wins

Most career wins

Most top division wins

Most wins in a calendar year (90 bouts)

Most consecutive wins

Most consecutive wins from entry into sumo

Best top division win ratios

All time
The list includes yokozuna and ōzeki (the highest rank before the yokozuna rank was introduced), but excludes so-called kanban or "guest ōzeki" (usually big men drawn from local crowds to promote a tournament who would never appear on the banzuke again) and wrestlers for which insufficient data is available.

Modern era
In 1927, the Tokyo Sumo Association merged with the Osaka Sumo Association to form the Japan Sumo Association, and most of the sumo systems were changed, so any pre-1927 records are disregarded. The list excludes active wrestlers.

Most bouts
Losses by default are excluded.

Most career bouts

Most top division bouts

Most consecutive bouts

Most consecutive career bouts

* No bouts missed in career/career to date

Most consecutive top division bouts

Most tournaments
The March 2011 and May 2020 tournaments were cancelled and are not included in these totals.

Most tournaments ranked in the top division

Most tournaments ranked at yokozuna

Most tournaments ranked at ōzeki

Most tournaments ranked in junior san'yaku (komusubi and sekiwake ranks)

Most career tournaments
As of November 2022 tournament

Progress to top division
The table for the fastest progress shows wrestlers with the fewest tournaments from their professional debut to their top division debut since the six tournaments a year system was introduced in 1958. It excludes  makushita tsukedashi and sandanme tsukedashi entrants who made their debut in the third makushita division and the fourth sandanme division.

Fastest progress to top division

Slowest progress to top division

Most special prizes
Special prizes or sanshō were first awarded in 1947. They can only be given to wrestlers ranked at sekiwake or below.  For the current list of active special prize winners, see here.

Most gold stars
Gold stars or kinboshi are awarded to maegashira ranked wrestlers who defeat a yokozuna. For a list of current kinboshi earners, see here.

See also
List of active gold star earners
List of active special prize winners
Glossary of sumo terms
List of active sumo wrestlers
List of past sumo wrestlers
List of sumo tournament top division champions
List of sumo tournament second division champions
List of sumo stables
List of years in sumo
List of yokozuna

Notes

References
Japan Sumo Association
Sumo Reference
The Sumo Colosseum
Grand Sumo, Lora Sharnoff, Weatherhill, 1993. 

Sports records and statistics
record holders